"Nothing's Changed Here" is a song co-written and recorded by American country music artist Dwight Yoakam.  It was co-written with the country songwriter Kostas and was released in July 1991 as the third single from Yoakam's album If There Was a Way.  It peaked at number 15 on the Billboard Hot Country Songs chart and it became his biggest hit from this album in Canada, reaching number 2 on the RPM country singles chart.

The song is not to be confused with "Nothing", also written by Yoakam and Kostas, that became a Top 20 hit in 1995 from Yoakam's album Gone.

Chart performance

Year-end charts

References

1991 singles
Dwight Yoakam songs
Songs written by Kostas (songwriter)
Songs written by Dwight Yoakam
Reprise Records singles
Song recordings produced by Pete Anderson
1990 songs